Celaenorrhinus kivuensis is a species of butterfly in the family Hesperiidae. It is found in the Democratic Republic of the Congo (from the east to Kivu) and Uganda (from the west to Kayonza).

References

Butterflies described in 1921
Kivuensis
Lepidoptera of the Democratic Republic of the Congo
Lepidoptera of Uganda
Butterflies of Africa